The Evangelical Reformed Baptist Churches in Italy, or CERBI, is an association of Reformed Baptist churches formed on 25 April 2006 in Bologna.

Theology 
The CERBI is part of the Reformed family of churches and recognises the great reformers such as Martin Luther, John Calvin, Peter Martyr Vermigli, John Knox, Roger Williams and Giovanni Diodati. CERBI supports the separation between church and state in Italy.

The group adheres to the
1689 Baptist Confession of Faith 
Cambridge Declaration of 1996,
The Evangelical Reformed Baptist Churches in Italy recognises the importance of reading the Scriptures and promoting the importance of the independence of the local churches. It further recognises the importance of establishing and maintaining constructive relationships between the cultural mandate of origin and the missionary vocation.

Practices 
The elders exercise a high level of authority.
Their reading of the Bible is not literal, but allegorical.

Social issues 
The denomination is committed to the social and cultural progress in Italy. It publishes the Alpha&Omega. It is a member of the Evangelical Alliance in Italy and the Committee of Evangelical Teachers in Italy. The church's emphasis on cultural issues is influenced by Dutch Neo-Calvinism.

Statistics 
Eleven churches in Italy are associated with this network, which places great emphasis on evangelisation and wishes to plant churches across Italy. In 2010 new churches were started in Rome and new projects are underway to have two other churches in the capital city in Italy by 2015.

Currently there are churches in Rome, Ferrara, Chieti, Trent, Milan, Modena, Vicenza, Padua and Caltanissetta. A growing number of other churches not part of this association describe themselves as Reformed Baptists in Agrigento, Rome, Modena, Teramo, Pescara and other Italian cities.

Interchurch relations 
The denomination is a member of the World Reformed Fellowship.

External links
www.cerbi.it CERBI official website

References 

Protestantism in Italy
Reformed Baptists denominations in Europe
Evangelicalism in Italy
Religious organisations based in Italy
Christian organizations established in 2006
Members of the World Reformed Fellowship